Jonas Stensrud Fjeldberg (born 30 September 1998) is a Norwegian professional footballer who plays as a winger for USL Championship club Indy Eleven.

Career

Ull/Kisa
Fjeldberg played from a young age with Ull/Kisa, making his first team debut in the 2014 1. divisjon. He also represented Norway as a youth international. In total, Fjeldberg made 42 appearances for the club across league and cup, scoring four goals. In 2017, he chose to decline a contract extension with the club and opted to play football and study in the United States.

University of Dayton & USL PDL
In 2017, Fjeldberg began playing college soccer at the University of Dayton. In four seasons with the Flyers, including an extended 2020–21 season due to the COVID-19 pandemic, Fjeldberg made 61 appearances, scoring 22 goals and tallying 21 assists. Whilst at college, Fjeldberg earned accolades such as Atlantic 10 All-Rookie Team in 2017, Atlantic 10 Offensive Player of the Year and A-10 First Team in both 2019 and 2020, as well as First Team All-Midwest Region in 2020.

In his 2019 season, Fjeldberg also played in the USL PDL with Dayton Dutch Lions, making seven appearances.

FC Cincinnati
On 21 January 2021, Fjeldberg was selected 54th overall in the 2021 MLS SuperDraft by FC Cincinnati. He then returned to Dayton to complete the 2020–21 season, before signing a one-year deal with the club on 20 May 2021.

Following the 2021 season, Cincinnati declined their contract option on Fjeldberg.

Rio Grande Valley FC (loan)
On 30 August 2021, Fjeldberg was loaned to USL Championship side Rio Grande Valley FC. He made his debut on 25 September 2021, scoring the winning goal in a 3–2 win over Atlanta United 2.

Indy Eleven
On 11 February 2022, it was announced that Fjeldberg has joined USL Championship side Indy Eleven ahead of their 2022 season.

Rio Grande Valley FC (loan)
Fjeldberg was again loaned to RGV on 25 July 2022, for the remainder of the 2022 USL Championship season. Rio Grande Valley sent centerback Jesús Vázquez to Indy in return.

References

1998 births
Living people
Association football midfielders
Dayton Dutch Lions players
Dayton Flyers men's soccer players
Expatriate soccer players in the United States
FC Cincinnati draft picks
FC Cincinnati players
Indy Eleven players
Norwegian expatriate footballers
Norwegian expatriate sportspeople in the United States
Norwegian First Division players
Norwegian footballers
Norway youth international footballers
People from Jessheim
Rio Grande Valley FC Toros players
Ullensaker/Kisa IL players
USL League Two players
USL Championship players
Sportspeople from Viken (county)